Tabulaephorus decipiens is a moth of the family Pterophoridae. It is found in Russia (the Caucasus region).

References

Moths described in 1870
Pterophorini